Cat Law (671 m) is a hill in the southern Mounth of Scotland, north of Kirriemuir in Angus.

A rounded peak, it lies above Strathmore in the south and offers excellent views across the Angus countryside from its summit. It is usually climbed from the nearby village of Balintore.

References

Mountains and hills of the Eastern Highlands
Mountains and hills of Angus, Scotland
Marilyns of Scotland
Grahams